Valloire-sur-Cisse (literally Valloire on Cisse) is a commune in the department of Loir-et-Cher, central France. The municipality was established on 1 January 2017 by merger of the former communes of Chouzy-sur-Cisse (the seat), Coulanges and Seillac.

See also 
Communes of the Loir-et-Cher department

References 

Communes of Loir-et-Cher